Tricondyloides is a genus of longhorn beetles of the subfamily Lamiinae, containing the following species:

 Tricondyloides armatus Montrouzier, 1861
 Tricondyloides caledonicus Breuning, 1947
 Tricondyloides elongatus Breuning, 1939
 Tricondyloides inermis Breuning, 1939
 Tricondyloides persimilis Breuning, 1939
 Tricondyloides rugifrons Breuning, 1951

References

Parmenini